Anne Spencer Parry (1931 – 26 January 1985) was one of the first Australian writers of fantasy.

Parry wrote a series of portal fantasy youth fiction beginning with The Land Behind the World (1976), in which a young girl finds a magic land through a magic portal. Her work remains in print as of 2018.

Works
 The Land Behind the World (1976)
 The Lost Souls of the Twilight (1977)
 The Crown of Darkness (1979)
 The Crown of Light (1980)
 Zaddik and the Seafarers (1983)
 Beyond the Outlandish Mountains (1984)
 The Council of Elders (2011)
 The Signbearers (2011)
 The Immortals (2011)

References

External links

Australian fantasy writers
Australian women novelists
1931 births
1985 deaths